In enzymology, a D-nopaline dehydrogenase is an enzyme that catalyzes the chemical reaction

N2-(D-1,3-dicarboxypropyl)-L-arginine + NADP+ + H2O  L-arginine + 2-oxoglutarate + NADPH + H+

The 3 substrates of this enzyme are N2-(D-1,3-dicarboxypropyl)-L-arginine, NADP+, and H2O, whereas its 4 products are L-arginine, 2-oxoglutarate, NADPH, and H+.

This enzyme belongs to the family of oxidoreductases, specifically those acting on the CH-NH group of donors with NAD+ or NADP+ as acceptor.  The systematic name of this enzyme class is N2-(D-1,3-dicarboxypropyl)-L-arginine:NADP+ oxidoreductase (L-arginine-forming). Other names in common use include D-nopaline synthase, nopaline dehydrogenase, nopaline synthase, NOS, 2-N-(D-1,3-dicarboxypropyl)-L-arginine:NADP+ oxidoreductase, and (L-arginine-forming).  This enzyme participates in arginine and proline metabolism.

References

 

EC 1.5.1
NADPH-dependent enzymes
Enzymes of unknown structure